Institute of Electrical and Electronics Engineers Young Professionals  is a vibrant community and growing network of young engineers, scientists, and technical experts, with member representations across the globe and throughout the IEEE societies. To recognize the contributions of these young professionals to the IEEE sensors community, IEEE Sensor Council has recently announced the Early Career (Young Professional) Award.

Recipients
2013: Carlos Ruiz Zamarreño
2012: Sinéad O’Keeffe
2011: Bhaskar Choubey
2010: Ville Viikari

Notes 

Early career awards
IEEE society and council awards